The Redmond School District is a school district in the U.S. state of Oregon that serves a  area in Deschutes and Jefferson counties, including the city of Redmond and the unincorporated communities of Alfalfa, Crooked River Ranch, Eagle Crest, Terrebonne, and Tumalo. The district has an enrollment of slightly more than 7,000 students.

Schools
The district operates 10 schools, an educational center, and a charter school.

Elementary schools
 John Tuck Elementary School (K–5)
 M.A. Lynch Elementary School (K–5)
 Sage Elementary School (K–5)
 Tom McCall Elementary School (K–5)
 Vern Patrick Elementary School (K–5)

Community schools
 Terrebonne Community School (K–5)
 Tumalo Community School (K–8)

Middle schools
 Elton Gregory Middle School (6–8)
 Obsidian Middle School (6–8)

High schools
Redmond High School (9–12)
Ridgeview High School (9-12)
 Redmond Proficiency Academy (6-12)

Educational center
 Edwin Brown Educational Center

See also 
 List of school districts in Oregon

References 

School districts in Oregon
Education in Deschutes County, Oregon
Education in Jefferson County, Oregon
Redmond, Oregon
1883 establishments in Oregon
School districts established in 1883